A sandcastle is a model castle made of sand.

Sandcastle, sand castle, etc., may also refer to:

Venues
 Sandcastle Water Park (Blackpool), a water park in Blackpool, Lancashire, England
 Sandcastle Waterpark, a water park near Pittsburgh, Pennsylvania, USA
 The Sandcastle (stadium), now Surf Stadium, a baseball park in Atlantic City, New Jersey, USA

Arts, entertainment, and media

Films
 Sand Castle (film), a 2017 film directed by Fernando Coimbra
 Sand Castles (film), a 2014 American independent drama film
 Sandcastle (film), a 2010 film directed by Boo Junfeng
Sandcastles, a 1972 television movie directed by Ted Post
 The Sand Castle, a 1961 film starring Mabel Mercer
 The Sand Castle (film), a 1977 stop motion short by Co Hoedeman

Literature
 Sandcastle, a 2011 graphic novel by Pierre Oscar Levy and Frederik Peeters
 The Sandcastle (novel), a 1957 novel by Iris Murdoch
 The Sand Castle (novel), a 2008 novel by Rita Mae Brown

Music
The Sandcastles, backing band of Shana Cleveland
 "Sand Castles" (song), a 1965 song by Elvis Presley included on the 2004 re-release album Paradise, Hawaiian Style
 "Sandcastles" (song), a 2016 song by Beyoncé from Lemonade
 "Sandcastles", a 1970 song by Aorta
 "Sandcastles", a 1972 song by Kincade
 "Sandcastles", a 1980 song by Journey from Dream, After Dream
 "Sandcastles", a 1995 song by Bomb the Bass from Clear
 "Sandcastles", a 1998 song by Eureka Farm from Analog
 "Sandcastle", a 2001 song by Regine Velasquez from Reigne
 "Sandcastles", a 2005 song mixed by Bonobo It Came from the Sea
 "Sandcastles", a 2005 song by Raised by Swans from Codes and Secret Longing
 "Sandcastles", a 2008 song by Donna Lewis from In the Pink
 "Sandcastles", a 2013 song by A Firm Handshake from Fix Me Up
 "Sandcastles", a 2013 song by The Regime from The Last Dragon
 "Sandcastles", a 2016 song by Jon English from History

Television
 "Sandcastles", a 1997 episode of Teletubbies
 The Sand Castle, a 1952 television series starring Kenneth Connor

Science and technology
 Sandcastle (software), the Microsoft document generation program
 Operation Sandcastle, the British disposal of chemical weapons